Colin Wilkie (born 13 September 1986) is former Italy international rugby league footballer who played as a utility for the Northern Pride in the Intrust Super Cup.

Background
Wilkie was born in Innisfail, Queensland, Australia and is of Italian descent.

He played his junior rugby league for the Tully Tigers. He attended Tully State High School and Kirwan State High School before being signed by the Melbourne Storm.

Wilkie has transitioned from player to coach and is currently an assistant coach at  Wynnum Manly Seagulls in the Brisbane A-Grade Rugby League (BRL) under the Queensland Rugby League (QRL).

Playing career
Wilkie was contracted to the Storm from 2002 to 2006, primarily playing for their Queensland Cup feeder club, the Norths Devils. In 2002 and 2003, he represented the Queensland under-17 side. In 2005, he was selected to play for the Queensland under-19 and Junior Kangaroos sides. In 2007, he joined the North Queensland Cowboys, spending the season playing for their Queensland Cup feeder club, the North Queensland Young Guns.

In 2015, after stints in the local Townsville and Newcastle competitions, Wilkie signed with the newly formed Queensland Cup side, the Townsville Blackhawks. He left without playing a game for the club, moving to the Northern Pride in 2016, where he played his first Queensland Cup game since 2007.

In 2016, he represented Italy in the 2017 Rugby League World Cup qualifiers, playing three games and scoring three tries. In 2017, he was named in Italy's 2017 Rugby League World Cup squad.

References

External links
2017 RLWC profile

1986 births
Living people
Australian rugby league players
Australian people of Italian descent
Italy national rugby league team players
Norths Devils players
Northern Pride RLFC players
Rugby league centres
Rugby league locks
Junior Kangaroos players
Rugby league players from Innisfail, Queensland